Mojtaba Bijan (born November 5, 1987) is an Iranian football midfielder who plays for Nassaji Mazandaran in Iran Pro League.

References 

1996 births
Living people
Iranian footballers
Nassaji Mazandaran players
Association football defenders
Naft Masjed Soleyman F.C. players
People from Rasht
Sportspeople from Gilan province